Jaitsri is an Indian classical raga that appears in the Sikh tradition from northern India and is part of the Guru Granth Sahib. It provided the setting for hymns by Guru Ram Das, Guru Arjan and Guru Tegh Bahadar for a total of 30 hymns.

It is the 26th raag, in order of appearance, in Guru Granth Sahib.

Jaitsiri conveys the heartfelt emotion of not being able to live without someone. Its mood is preoccupied with feelings of dependence and an overwhelming sense of desperately reaching out to be with that person.

The following represents the order of notes that can be used on the ascending and descending phase of the composition and the primary and secondary notes:

See also 
 Kirtan

References

External links 
 Sikh Kirtan Community
 Gurmat Sangeet Project
 Raj Academy of Asian Music
 Sikhnet: Shabad for Printing
 SCRIBD

Hindustani ragas
Ragas in the Guru Granth Sahib